The Billings Police Department is a police department in Billings, Montana, the main law enforcement service in Billings, Montana. It is the largest city police force in Montana with 162 sworn officers/80 civilian employees covering  and a population of about 115,000. The city is divided into nine beats and patrolled by 75 officers.  Organizationally the department is broken up into the Operations (Patrol) Division and the Investigations Division.

Rank structure and insignia

History

Before the Billings Police Department was established, most of the law enforcing was done by the sheriffs office or by vigilantes. The Billings Police Department was established in 1902 with about 10 Police officers on duty. Most of their jobs were shutting down red light districts and patrolling the streets. As the city grew, so did their responsibilities.

Controversies & Misconduct

In 2001, the Billings Police Department settled a Racial profiling case for $50,000 with the ACLU.

Some 28 current and former Billing Police officers filed a lawsuit in January 2009 claiming that the city miscalculated their pay, possibly dating as far back as 1994.

In October 2012, members of a city/county SWAT deployed a flash grenade in a home they were raiding. The device went off and burned a twelve-year-old girl. Although the team was looking for a drug-manufacturing lab, they found nothing and made no arrests. The child was treated at a local hospital.

In April 2014, Billings Police officer, Grant Morrison, shot and killed 38 year old Richard Ramirez during a traffic stop in an alley between Fifth Ave. S. and State Ave. A coroner's inquest found Morrison was justified in the shooting, however the Ramirez family later filed a wrongful death lawsuit which the City of Billings settled with them for $550,000 in lieu of going to trial in a civil case. 

In April 2018, three Billings police officers were disciplined for having sex on city property.

Chiefs
Ronald (Ron) Tussing - 1997 to 2005
Richard (Rich) St. John - 2005 to present

Line of Duty Deaths
Sergeant Robert T Hannah (EOW - July 2, 1904)
Policeman Enos Nelson (EOW - December 17, 1917)
Patrolman Arthur D. Pettit (EOW - December 23, 1935)
Detective Alexander F. Mavity (EOW - February 14, 1989)

See also

 List of law enforcement agencies in Montana

References

External links

Government of Billings, Montana
Municipal police departments of Montana
1992 establishments in Montana